The First Commandment is a 2007 spy thriller novel written by Brad Thor. It was Thor's sixth book preceded by Takedown, and was followed by The Last Patriot. It features his fictional character Scot Harvath. It was first published by Pocket Books in the United States in July 2007, in hardback and paperback.

Plot
This novel starts with five highly dangerous detainees pulled out from their cells in Guantanamo Bay detention camp, stripped off their jumpsuits and changed into civilian clothes. That includes a dangerous man named Phillipe Rousard.

Six months later, Rousard attempted to murder Scot Harvath's girlfriend, Tracy, but left her severely incapacitated. and uses blood to paint his house door red. After the president's order to stay away from this case, Scot plans his own mission to kill Rousard. As time passes by, Rousard slowly harms the people closest to Scot using his own version of the Ten Plagues.

Reception
Kirkus Reviews called The First Commandment "Incessant action and artless narration for G. Gordon Liddy fans." while Publishers Weekly wrote "It's a long, violent, shoot-'em-up, blow-'em-up pulse-pounder that will leave Thor's fans cheering and begging for more." The South Utah Independent noted it "is eerily prescient of the Bowe Bergdahl prisoner exchange" and "All in all, it is an excellent mystery/thriller, and definitely worth your time."

See also
 The Apostle (novel)
 The Last Patriot
 The Lions of Lucerne (novel)

References

2007 American novels
American spy novels
Pocket Books books